Graylands Copse is a largely inaccessible woodland in Graylands, near Horsham, England.

The woodland has a convex outline, being primarily inaccessible at all edges except for an unmaintained opening on the south-western edge, in which a footbridge had existed. The interior is very irregular, defined by dense thickets and dead wood. An unnamed stream cuts through the center of the copse.

A small pit exists in the opposing south-eastern corner, possibly a man-made quarry feature typical of woodland in the area. One former footpath and one track run through Graylands Copse in a north–south direction, neither are maintained or easily accessible.

Historical Ordnance Survey maps indicate that the eastern central portion (approximately ) of Graylands Copse underwent a forest plantation in the mid to late 20th century to define agricultural boundaries.

Notably, a medieval moated site exists 200 metres (656 ft) from Graylands Copse.

References 

Forests and woodlands of West Sussex